Stan Lee's Lucky Man is a British crime drama television series, produced by Carnival Films and POW! Entertainment for Sky 1, which follows the story of Murder Squad detective Harry Clayton (James Nesbitt), who is granted the power to control luck.

The first series debuted on 22 January 2016, and was watched by 1.14 million viewers, making it Sky 1's most successful original drama series to date.

The series was renewed for a second season, which began filming in June 2016 and was first broadcast on 24 February 2017. On 25 August 2017, the drama was renewed for a third series of eight new episodes. Series 3 began filming September 2017 and is available only on Sky 1 and TV streaming service Now TV in the UK and Ireland which started on 20 July 2018.

Plot
DI Harry Clayton is a detective in Central London's Murder Squad suffering from an addiction to gambling. Clayton becomes the recipient of an ancient bracelet: after a night spent with the mysterious Eve, he wakes up to find the bracelet on his wrist and discovers that it can give to him supernatural luck. With his gambling addiction having cost him his wife and daughter and being in debt for thousands of pounds to a casino owner, Clayton soon begins to use the bracelet to his own advantage.

Cast

Current
 James Nesbitt as Harry Clayton; a Detective Inspector working for the Central London Murder Squad
 Sienna Guillory as Eve Alexandri; a mysterious woman who gifts the bracelet to Clayton
 Darren Boyd as Steve Orwell; a Detective Sergeant (formerly Inspector), who initially believes that Clayton is corrupt
 Stephen Hagan as Rich Clayton; Harry's half-brother and owner of an antiques warehouse
 Omid Djalili as Kalim; an associate of Clayton's and owner of a London strip club (Series 1 and 3)

Former
 Neve McIntosh as Elizabeth Gray; Detective Superintendent and head of the Murder Squad (Series 3)
 Eve Best as Anna Clayton; Clayton's estranged wife and a criminal barrister (Series 1–2)
 Steven Mackintosh as Alistair Winter; Detective Superintendent and former head of the Murder Squad (Series 1–2)
 Thekla Reuten as Isabella Augustine; the owner of a bracelet identical to Harry's (Series 2)
 Leilah de Meza as Daisy Clayton; Harry and Anna's teenage daughter (Series 1–3)
 Sendhil Ramamurthy as Nikhail Julian; a prison governor and love interest of Anna Clayton (Series 1–2)
 Jing Lusi as Lily-Anne Lau; owner of the Green Dragon Casino (Series 1–2)
 Jonathan Kerrigan as Jonny; Anna Clayton's new boyfriend (Series 2)
 John Hopkins as Charles Collins; Golding's right-hand man (Series 1)
 Burn Gorman as Doug; police pathologist (Series 1)
 Kenneth Tsang as Freddie Lau; Lily-Anne's father (Series 1)
 Joseph Gatt as Yury Becker; a hitman hired by Golding (Series 1)
 Amara Karan as Suri Chohan; a Detective Inspector (formerly Sergeant), who is Clayton's protégé and partner (Series 1–3)
 Rupert Penry-Jones as Samuel Blake; a mysterious businessman with connections to triad gangs (Series 3)

Production

Development
The concept for the series began as Stan Lee's answer to fans' questions about what super power he would like to have: luck. After starting up POW!, he and his team considered making a TV series based on such a super power. Neil Biswas then took Lee's original idea and wrote the pilot episode, developing the central character and the world around him. With the help of his writing team, Biswas developed the mythology for the first series: Stan Lee's original idea of a lucky charm that is given to a compulsive gambler became an ancient bracelet that Harry Clayton wakes up with on his wrist after a night spent with the mysterious Eve. With his gambling addiction having cost him his wife and daughter, and being in debt for thousands of pounds to a casino owner, Clayton soon begins to use the bracelet to his own advantage.

The series is executive produced by Richard Fell and Gareth Neame, with Stan Lee (who has one cameo per season) and Gill Champion serving as co-executive producers. Neil Biswas, who was the lead writer of the first season, also co-executive produced and was credited as co-creator of the show. As of October 2021, there have been no official announcements on a fourth season.

Episodes

Series 1 (2016)

Series 2 (2017)

Series 3 (2018) 
Harry learns that the Torch are a benevolent triad that has been watching over the bracelets for centuries. Along with managing the bracelets, Torch have the original hammer used to create them.  Harry also runs across the Wu Chi triad, a deadly gang that is intent on destroying the bracelets, believing they are an abomination. Samuel Blake, an operative with MI6, is the adopted son of the leader of the Wu Chi, using his double connections to frame Harry for the murder (rather than suicide) of Isabella Augustine. With Harry's access to his own support group of police and family now limited, Blake works to retrieve Harry's bracelet.

References

External links 
 
 
 

2010s British drama television series
2016 British television series debuts
2018 British television series endings
2010s British crime television series
British action television series
English-language television shows
Sky UK original programming
Television shows set in London
British fantasy television series
Stan Lee